Club Deportivo Pedroñeras is a Spanish football club located in Las Pedroñeras, Cuenca, in the autonomous community of Castilla–La Mancha. Founded in 1964 it currently plays in Tercera División – Group 18, holding home matches at Municipal de Las Pedroñeras with a capacity of 1,000 spectators.

History 
The club was founded in 1964. In 2019 it won the Preferente La Mancha and promoted to the Tercera División.

Season to season

7 seasons in Tercera División

References 

Football clubs in Castilla–La Mancha
Association football clubs established in 1964
Divisiones Regionales de Fútbol clubs
1964 establishments in Spain